Matthias Gey (born 7 July 1960) is a German fencer. He won silver medals in the team foil events at the 1984 and 1988 Summer Olympics.

References

External links
 

1960 births
Living people
German male fencers
Olympic fencers of West Germany
Fencers at the 1984 Summer Olympics
Fencers at the 1988 Summer Olympics
Olympic silver medalists for West Germany
Olympic medalists in fencing
People from Tauberbischofsheim
Sportspeople from Stuttgart (region)
Medalists at the 1984 Summer Olympics
Medalists at the 1988 Summer Olympics